Raidhu (IAST: Raidhū; 1393–1489) was an Apabhramsha poet from Gwalior, and an important figure in the Digambara Jain community. He supervised the pratishtha consecration ceremony of many—perhaps most—of the Jain idols carved on the hill side in the Gwalior Fort during the rule of Tomara rulers Dungarasimha and Kirtisimha.

Biography 

Raidhu was born in the Padmavati Purval Jain community, as he himself acknowledged. His birthplace is uncertain, but he appears to have spent most of his life in or around Gwalior. He was a lay disciple of the Jain leader Bramha Shripal, who was a disciple of Bhattaraka Yashahkiriti of Kashtha Sangha.

Raidhu was an important figure in the Gwalior court, where he stayed at the invitation of the Tomara king Dungarasimha. He was also a close associate of the Digambara ascetics (Bhattarakas) who were influential in the Tomara court. Besides, Raidhu was patronized by several wealthy Jain merchants. Raidhu played a central role in connecting these different groups together: he authored religious books for the wealthy merchants, and encouraged them to donate money towards religious causes.

Raidhu's powerful and wealthy sponsors helped disseminate his literary works, some of which are lavishly illustrated (e.g. Jasodharacariu). These patrons included Kamalasimha, Yashahkirti, Khelha Brahmachari, Sanghadhipati Nemadasa and Asapati. Kamalasimha started the development of Gwalior as a Jain holy place, with support from the Tomara rulers Dungarasimha and Kirtisimha. The Digambara monk Yashahkirti and Khelha Brahmachari encouraged Raidhu to write Sammaijiṇacariu, a biography of Mahavira. Khelha also commissioned the colossal image of Chandraprabha. Sanghadhipati Nemadasa was a patron of Raidhu's poem Puṇṇāsavakahākosa, and also built a Jain shrine on his recommendation. Asapati was a minister of the Tomara king Dungarasimha.

Jain images 

Raidhu was also responsible for consecrating many of the Jain rock carvings inside the fort, as attested by multiple inscriptions. These include the two colossal images of Adinatha (57 feet) and Chandraprabha. Medieval Jain texts state that certain sacred mountains covered with images of Jinas would survive the destruction of the world. Raidhu's poems often mention the end times, and several near-contemporary poets also allude to the end times amid the Muslim conquests. Therefore, it appears that the colossal Jain images were intended to ensure the survival of Gopalagiri (the Gwalior fort hill) in the end times.

Literary works 

Raidhu composed several poems in Apabhramsha, many of which have survived. He composed many of these poems while living in the Jain temples of Gopalagiri. Raja Ram Jain translated Raidhu's poems into Hindi language.

Raidhu's known works include:

 Anathmi Kaha
 Appa Samboha Kavva ("Addressing myself")
 Balahadda Chariu, written at the request of Agrawal Sahu Harsi.
 Bhadrabāhucariu
 An account of Bhadrabahu
 Dashalakshana Jayamala
 Dhanakumar Chariu
 Jasodhara-Chariu
 Jivandhar Chariu
 Mesehar Chariu
 Puṇṇāsavakahākosa (Punnasava-kahakosa)
 Composed at the request of Sanghadhipati Nemadasa
 Ritthanemi Chariu
 Sammaijiṇacariu or Sammai Jinachariu
 A biography of Mahavira, written on the request of Khelha Brahmachari, the son of Agrawal Sahu Tosau of Hisar. The book also gives a history of the family of Sahu Tosau since the time of Feroze Shah.
 Sammat Gunanihana
 written on the request of Goel Agrawal Kamal Singh in sam 1492.
 Savaya Chariu
 Written at the request of Golalare Sandhadhip Kusharaj
 Shodhashakarana Jayamala
 Siddhantartha Sar
 Siripal Chariu
 Sukaushal Chariu
 Vrattasar

Some of his texts are still being discovered in Jain libraries. A Raidhu Award, named after him, of Rs. 21,000 is given every year by the Shyamlal Shastri Trust in Firozabad, Uttar Pradesh.

See also
Jain literature
History of the Hindi language

References

Bibliography 

 

Prof. Raja Ram Jain

14th-century Indian poets
Hindi-language poets
Indian Jain poets
14th-century Indian Jains
15th-century Indian Jains
15th-century Indian poets
Hindi-language writers
Poets from Madhya Pradesh